Chris Corry (born 1982) is an American politician and businessman serving as a member of the Washington House of Representatives from the 14th district, which includes portions of Yakima County, Washington.

Education 
Corry earned a Bachelor of Arts degree in political science from the University of Washington.

Career 
After graduating from college, Corry moved to Southern California, where he met his wife, Jennica. The two eventually moved to Yakima, Washington, Jennica's hometown. Corry has worked as a risk management advisor and in the insurance industry. Elected in 2018, Corry assumed office on January 14, 2019.

References 

University of Washington alumni
Republican Party members of the Washington House of Representatives
Living people
21st-century American politicians
1982 births